Dr. Saad Ali Shire Naleye is British-Somaliland politician, agronomist and economist, who is currently serving as the Minister of Finance of Somaliland. Shire formerly served as the Foreign Minister of Somaliland. He is also served as the Minister of Planning and National Development of Somaliland. He is a founder member of many academic institutions and professional associations including The University of Hargeisa, the University of Burao, Somaliland Society of Agriculture, Somaliland Economics Association, Somaliland Statistics Association, and Somaliland Society of UK.

Early life and education
Shire was born in Burao. He later moved to Mogadishu, where he studied agriculture at Somali National University, then to Havana University in Cuba, where he earned a bachelor's degree. He subsequently attended Pennsylvania State University in the United States, where he completed his master's and PhD degrees in agricultural economics. He also has a post graduate diploma in Islamic banking. He is an IMC member of the Chartered Financial Analysts (CFA) Society of UK.

Career

Early career
Prior to joining the politics, He was the managing director for UK and Europe of Dahabshiil Transfer Services Limited, (a money service company). Before that he held senior positions in the community development sector, lectured at the College of Agriculture at Somali National University and worked for the UN Food and Agricultural organization (FAO). He also worked for the  World Bank headquarters in Washington DC.

Minister of Planning
On 28 July 2010, after Kulmiye won the 2010 presidential election, President Ahmed Mohamed Mohamoud appointed Shire as the Minister of Planning and National Development where he stay until 2015.

Minister of Foreign affairs
After the resignation of his predecessor Mohamed Yonis, Shire was transferred into Minister of Foreign Affairs and International Cooperation, he was one of few ministers who made a comeback after the 2017 presidential election which Muse Bihi Abdi won as new President of Somaliland, along Shukri Haji Ismail and Khalil Abdillahi Ahmed.

Minister of Finance
Shire was appointed for the current post as Minister of Financial Development by president Bihi after his first cabinet reshuffle in November 2018.

Committee assignments
During his tenure as minister he served in many committees including the National Planning commission, Somaliland Development Fund Joint Steering Committee, Somaliland Business Fund Grant Advisory Panel, Civil Service Reform Committee, Public Finance Reform Committee, Budget Policy Committee, Private Sector Reform Committee, Land Policy Reform Committee, Berbera Port/Corridor Development Committee, the Board of the University of Hargeisa and the Board of Berbera Maritime and Fisheries Academy.

See also
 Ministry of Foreign Affairs (Somaliland)
 Ministry of Finance (Somaliland)
 Ministry of Planning (Somaliland)
 List of Somalis

References

|-

|-

People from Burao
Peace, Unity, and Development Party politicians
Pennsylvania State University alumni
Somali National University alumni
University of Havana alumni
Issa Musa
Government ministers of Somaliland
Foreign Ministers of Somaliland
Planning Ministers of Somaliland
Finance Ministers of Somaliland
Year of birth missing (living people)
Living people